An economist is a practitioner in the social science discipline of economics.

Economist or The Economist may also refer to:

 Economist Group, a British multinational media company headquartered in London
 Economist Party (Peru), a political party in Peru
 Economist Party (Thailand), a political party in Thailand
 De Economist, the quarterly review of The Royal Netherlands Economic Association

 The Economist, an English-language weekly news and international affairs magazine-format newspaper
 The Economist (Lost),  the third episode of the fourth season in the TV series Lost

See also 

 Economy (disambiguation)
 The Economists' Voice
 List of economists
 The Oeconomist